Koromogawa No.5 Dam  is an earthfill dam located in Iwate Prefecture in Japan. The dam is used for flood control and irrigation. The catchment area of the dam is 2.6 km2. The dam impounds about 4  ha of land when full and can store 283 thousand cubic meters of water. The construction of the dam was  completed in 1954.

See also
List of dams in Japan

References

Dams in Iwate Prefecture